Events from the year 2007 in Kuwait.

Incumbents
Emir: Sabah Al-Ahmad Al-Jaber Al-Sabah 
Prime Minister: Nasser Al-Sabah

Events

Establishments

 Alam Al Yawm.
 Al-Jarida.

References

 
Kuwait
Kuwait
Years of the 21st century in Kuwait
2000s in Kuwait